San Lorenzo del Vallo  is an Arbëreshë  town and comune in the province of Cosenza in the Calabria region of southern Italy.

References

Arbëresh settlements
Cities and towns in Calabria